"Street of Shadows" is the fifty-third episode and the eighteenth episode of the third season (1988–89) of the television series The Twilight Zone. In this episode, an amateur burglar switches bodies with his wealthy target.

Plot
Builder Steve Cranston is living in a homeless shelter with his family. He has virtually given up hope and makes minimal effort at finding jobs. Moreover, the homeless shelter is about to close. After an argument with his wife Elaine, Steve takes a walk. He overhears a security services repairman mention that he was unable to restore the alarm system of the nearby house. Steve slips inside the gate before it closes, and searches the house until he finds a wallet filled with cash. The owner of the house, Frederick Perry, sees Steve's muddy footprints, gets his gun, and finds Steve. Steve assaults Frederick with a bottle, but Frederick shoots him.

Steve awakens the next morning in Frederick's bed. The butler addresses Steve as Frederick Perry, even though Steve sees his own reflection in the mirror. Steve also sees himself in a photo with Frederick's lover, whom he has never met. He calls the shelter to discover that Elaine is at the hospital since her husband was shot. Steve goes to the hospital and talks to Elaine, but she and his daughter see him as Frederick. He goes into the room to see the real Frederick in a coma, but Elaine kicks him out.

Steve meets with Frederick's lawyer, who tells him of the massive profits he has just made. Steve tells him to use some of it to buy out the shelter so it will not close. Later on, Steve becomes disoriented and collapses. He wakes up in the hospital with Elaine and their daughter. They once again know him as Steve. He learns from Elaine that Frederick dropped the charges and donated the money to save the shelter, and that the director of the shelter is hiring Steve to do work on the building now that they have extra money.

External links
 

1989 American television episodes
The Twilight Zone (1985 TV series season 3) episodes